The 1926 Grand National was the 85th renewal of the Grand National horse race that took place at Aintree near Liverpool, England, on 26 March 1926.

The steeplechase was won by Jack Horner, a 25/1 bet ridden by jockey Billy Watkinson and trained by Harvey Leader for American owner Charles Schwartz, who had paid 5,000 guineas for him a week beforehand. Schwartz won £5,000 for the victory.

Harvey Leader was a brother of Ted Leader and son of Tom Leader.

Old Tay Bridge finished in second place for the second successive year, Bright's Boy was third and Sprig fourth. Sprig won the National the following year under Ted Leader.

Silvo and Grecian Wave — both well fancied runners — fell at the first fence. Irish favourite Knight of the Wilderness went at the third. At Becher's Brook, Lee Bridge fell and brought down Koko.

Thirty horses ran in the race and all but one returned safely to the stables. Lone Hand was fatally injured in a fall.

Finishing Order

Non-finishers

References

 1926
Grand National
Grand National
20th century in Lancashire